Albert Boer (1935, Beverwijk – 3 October 2002, Groet) was the author of Kamp Schoorl.

The book is in Dutch and is the history of an internment camp in Schoorl, Netherlands. Born in the Netherlands in 1935, he came to the United States in the mid-1950s and attended Atlanta University (now Clark), part of Morehouse and Spelman Colleges. He worked in the civil rights movement for years and worked at and directed Settlement Houses (United South End Settlements, Franklin-Wright Settlement and Elizabeth Peabody House). He was an accomplished sculptor in wood, clay and bronze. The sculpture of Harriet Tubman in the Harriet Tubman House is his.  He lived in two houseboats - one in Fort Point Channel and one in Schoorl, Nederlands. Boer moved back to the Netherlands in mid-1980s, bought a Pension (a type of guesthouse) which he named the Sneeuwgans (the snowgoose) and later wrote Kamp Schoorl.

Published book for United South End Settlements called The Development of USES in 1966. A chronology of the United South End Settlements, 1891–1966 and written in English.

References 

1935 births
2002 deaths
Dutch male writers
People from Beverwijk
People from Schoorl